Carovigno is a railway station near the Italian town of Carovigno, in the Province of Brindisi, Apulia. The station lies on the Adriatic Railway (Ancona–Lecce) and was opened in 1865. The train services are operated by Trenitalia.

Train services
The station is served by the following service(s):

Regional services (Treno regionale) Bari - Monopoli - Brindisi - Lecce

See also
Railway stations in Italy
List of railway stations in Apulia
Rail transport in Italy
History of rail transport in Italy

References 

 This article is based upon a translation of the Italian language version as of May 2014.

Railway stations in Apulia
Railway stations opened in 1865
Buildings and structures in the Province of Brindisi